Spotlight is a 2008 South Korea television series, starring Son Ye-jin and Ji Jin-hee. It aired on MBC from May 14 to July 3, 2008, on Wednesdays and Thursdays at 21:55 for 16 episodes.

The series revolves around the world of television news and the lives of four news reporters.

Plot
Oh Tae Suk (Ji Jin-hee), a supervisor in a news division, works with his junior reporter Seo Woo Jin (Son Ye-jin) to expose the injustices of society.

Cast

Main characters
Son Ye-jin as Seo Woo-jin
Ji Jin-hee as Oh Tae-suk
Jo Yoon-hee as Cha Myung-eun
Jin Goo as Lee Seon-chul

Supporting characters
Kim Jeong-wook as Seo Woo-hyeon
Kim Bo-kyung as Lee Joo-hee 
Ahn Suk-hwan as Ahn Joong-seok
Lee Ki-yeol as Moon Jae-gook
Jeong Gyu-soo as Jeong Seong-il
Lee Dae-yeon as Det. Go Byung-chun
Jeong Jin as Jang Jin-gyu
Im Seung-dae as Lee Choon-ki
Park Yong-gi as Director Lee Jae-myeong
Min Ah-ryung as Reporter Jung
Park Yoon-jae as Yoon Seok-chang
Jeon In-taek as Woo-jin's father
Geum Bo-ra as Woo-jin's mother
Jung Hye-young as Kim Mi-hee (cameo, episode 1)
Kim Cheol-ki as Mi-hee's husband
Shin Chae-won
Min Seo-hyun
Jeong Hoon
Choi Seung-kyung 
SS501 (cameo)
 Ryu Ui-hyun

Ratings

References

External links
 Spotlight official MBC website 
 Spotlight at MBC Global Media
 

2008 South Korean television series debuts
2008 South Korean television series endings
Korean-language television shows
MBC TV television dramas
Television series about journalism